Arthur Hill-Trevor may refer to:

Arthur Hill-Trevor, 1st Viscount Dungannon (c. 1694–1771), Irish politician
Arthur Hill-Trevor, 1st Baron Trevor (1819–1894)
Arthur Hill-Trevor, 3rd Viscount Dungannon (1798–1862)

See also
Arthur Hill (disambiguation)
Arthur Trevor (disambiguation)